Baba Haneef Ud Din Reshi (کٲشُر:با با حنیٖفُ الدیٖن ریٖشی) popularly known as "Babii Seab", was a Sufi of Rishi order, who lived in the area of the Rathsun-Manchama, Budgam Jammu and Kashmir and also his shrine is located at the same place (usually called 'Da-aresh'). He was the disciple of Zain Ud Din Wali of Aishmuquam (who was the disciple of Sheikh Noor ud Din Noorani). Zain Ud Din Wali ordered him to go on the hillock of Rathsun-Manchama village, where he gets busy in the Religious practices to gain Spirituality.

Shrine 

His shrine is located on the top of the hill ('Da-aresh') at Rathsun village, this shrine is about 400 year old. It is 30 km away from Srinagar and 4.5 km far away from Magam town.

See also 
 Nund Rishi
 Mir Sayyid Ali Hamadani
 Bulbul Shah
 Baba Naseeb-ud-Din Ghazi

References 

Sufis
Kashmir
Sufi shrines
Year of birth unknown
Year of death unknown